was a Japanese politician, serving in the House of Representatives in the Diet (national legislature) as a member of the Liberal Democratic Party.

Career
Born in the village of Yamakoshi, Niigata (now part of the city of Nagaoka), Nagashima graduated the Toyo University.

He served as mayor of his hometown Yamakoshi between 2000 and 2005, the year the village, severely damaged by an earthquake in 2004, merged with the city of Nagaoka.

Nagashima was elected to the Diet for the first time in 2005.

According to the LDP website, he held the following positions: 
Headman, Yamakoshi Village
Member, Diet Affairs Committee of LDP
Deputy Director Secretary, Special Committee on Disasters of LDP
Minister of State for Disaster Management of LDP's Shadow Cabinet
Vice-Chairman, Committee on Judicial Affairs and Local Autonomous Organizations of LDP
Parliamentary Secretary of Agriculture, Forestry and Fisheries
Parliamentary Secretary for Reconstruction

Positions
Nagashima was affiliated to the openly revisionist lobby Nippon Kaigi, and a member of the following right-wing groups in the Diet:
Nippon Kaigi Diet discussion group (日本会議国会議員懇談会 - Nippon kaigi kokkai giin kondankai)
Diet Celebration League of the 20th Anniversary of His Majesty The Emperor's Accession to the Throne (天皇陛下御即位二十年奉祝国会議員連盟)
Conference of parliamentarians on the Shinto Association of Spiritual Leadership (神道政治連盟国会議員懇談会 - Shinto Seiji Renmei Kokkai Giin Kondankai) - NB: SAS a.k.a. Sinseiren, Shinto Political League

Nagashima gave the following answers to the questionnaire submitted by Mainichi to parliamentarians in 2014:
no answer regarding the revision of the Article 9 of the Japanese Constitution
no answer regarding the right of collective self-defense
no answer regarding nuclear plants
against visits of a Prime Minister to the controversial Yasukuni Shrine
in favor of the revision of the Murayama Statement
no answer regarding the revision of the Kono Statement
no answer regarding laws preventing hate speech
no answer regarding question whether Marine Corps Air Station Futenma is a burden for Okinawa
no answer regarding the Special Secrecy Law
no answer regarding teaching 'morality' in school

References 

 

1951 births
2017 deaths
Members of the House of Representatives (Japan)
Mayors of places in Japan
Koizumi Children
People from Nagaoka, Niigata
Toyo University alumni
Members of Nippon Kaigi
Liberal Democratic Party (Japan) politicians